The horned lantern fish or prickly seadevil (Centrophryne spinulosa) is a deep-sea anglerfish found worldwide. It is the sole species in the family Centrophrynidae, distinguished from other deep-sea anglerfishes by various characters including four pectoral radials, an anterior spine on the subopercular bone, and a short hyoid (chin) barbel in both sexes.

Distribution
The horned lantern fish occurs in the Pacific Ocean from Baja California south to the Marquesas Islands and the Gulf of California. Specimens have also been captured in other locations, including New Guinea, the South China Sea, Venezuela, and the Mozambique Channel, suggesting a wide oceanic distribution in tropical and subtropical waters.

Description
The jaws are filled with slender, recurved, depressible teeth of mixed large and small sizes. There is a large oval pit in front of each eye in specimens larger than 42 mm. The eye itself lies beneath the skin and appears through a translucent patch. The fish is reddish brown to black in color; its skin is covered with numerous close-set spines. The illicium ("fishing rod") and esca (lure) are attached to the snout. The esca has a fan-shaped appendage in front and another short appendage on the back; the tip is white with scattered large melanophores. There is a small hyoid barbel, although it is vestigial in adult females.

The known specimens are all immature, though already with large olfactory organs and well-developed denticular plates on the tip of the snout bearing 3-4 curved teeth each. Their hyoid barbel distinguishes them from the males of all other deep-sea anglerfish. The two known larvae measure 4.2 mm and 7.5 mm long and have short, stout bodies with moderately inflated skin.

Biology
Unlike other deep-sea anglerfish, female horned lantern fish have only a single ovary lined with villi-like epithelial projections rather than epithelial folds. Similar to other ceratioid anglerfish, the males of the horned lantern fish undergo sexual parasitism. A female horned lantern fish has been found with a parasitic male Melanocetus johnsonii attached, though the coupling was likely in error (possibly occurring while the two fish were in the net) and there was no fusion of tissues.

The function of the hyoid barbel in the horned lantern fish is unknown. The only other deep-sea anglerfishes that have a hyoid barbel are the linophrynids, where it occurs only in the females and is often elaborate and/or bioluminescent.

References

Lophiiformes
Fish described in 1932
Monotypic fish genera